The 2015 AFC Champions League knockout stage was played from 19 May to 21 November 2015. A total of 16 teams competed in the knockout stage to decide the champions of the 2015 AFC Champions League.

Qualified teams
The winners and runners-up of each of the eight groups in the group stage qualified for the knockout stage. Both West Zone and East Zone had eight teams qualified.

Format
In the knockout stage, the 16 teams played a single-elimination tournament, with the teams split between the two zones until the final. Each tie was played on a home-and-away two-legged basis. The away goals rule, extra time (away goals do not apply in extra time) and penalty shoot-out were used to decide the winner if necessary.

Schedule
The schedule of each round was as follows.

Bracket
In the round of 16, the winners of one group played the runners-up of another group in the same zone, with the group winners hosting the second leg. The matchups are determined as follows:

West Zone
Winner Group A vs. Runner-up Group C
Winner Group C vs. Runner-up Group A
Winner Group B vs. Runner-up Group D
Winner Group D vs. Runner-up Group B

East Zone
Winner Group E vs. Runner-up Group G
Winner Group G vs. Runner-up Group E
Winner Group F vs. Runner-up Group H
Winner Group H vs. Runner-up Group F

The draw for the quarter-finals was held on 18 June 2015, 16:00 UTC+8, at the Grand Millennium Hotel in Kuala Lumpur, Malaysia. Teams from different zones could not be drawn into the same tie, and there was no seeding or country protection, so teams from the same association could be drawn into the same tie.

In the semi-finals, the matchups were determined by the quarter-final draw: Winner QF1 vs. Winner QF2 (West Zone) and Winner QF3 vs. Winner QF4 (East Zone), with winners QF2 and QF4 hosting the second leg.

In the final, the finalist from the West Zone hosted the first leg, while the finalist from the East Zone hosted the second leg (no draw was held to determine the order of legs, as it was reversed from the previous season's final).

Round of 16

|-
|+West Zone

|}

|+East Zone

|}

First leg

Second leg

4–4 on aggregate. Kashiwa Reysol won on away goals.

Jeonbuk Hyundai Motors won 2–1 on aggregate.

Lekhwiya won 4–3 on aggregate.

Al-Hilal won 3–1 on aggregate.

Gamba Osaka won 6–3 on aggregate.

Guangzhou Evergrande won 3–2 on aggregate.

3–3 on aggregate. Al-Ahli won on away goals.

2–2 on aggregate. Naft Tehran won on away goals.

Quarter-finals

|-
|+West Zone

|}

|+East Zone

|}

First leg

Notes

Second leg

Guangzhou Evergrande won 4–2 on aggregate.

Al-Hilal won 6–3 on aggregate.

Gamba Osaka won 3–2 on aggregate.

Al-Ahli won 3–1 on aggregate.

Semi-finals

|-
|+West Zone

|}

|+East Zone

|}

First leg

Second leg

Al-Ahli won 4–3 on aggregate.

Guangzhou Evergrande won 2–1 on aggregate.

Final

|}

Guangzhou Evergrande won 1–0 on aggregate.

References

External links
AFC Champions League, the-AFC.com

3